There are numerous protected areas in Belgium with a wide variety of types, protection levels and sizes. The below list gives an overview of the most important protected areas.

National parks
There is currently three national parks in Belgium, De Hoge Kempen National Park opening in 2006., Nationaal Park L'Entre-Sambre-et-Meuse and Nationaal Park Vallée de la Semois.

Natural parks
There are many natural parks in Belgium, including 9 in Wallonia (called Parcs Naturels).

Nature reserves
There are many tiny nature reserves, including:
Zwin 1.58 km² (1.25 km² on Belgian territory)

See also
List of national parks

References

Belgium
 
Protected areas
Protected areas